This is a list of newspapers in Guyana.

Newspapers

Defunct newspapers 

 Courant van Essequebo en Demerary - 1793, published in Stabroek, Essequibo. The oldest newspaper in the country.
 The Essequebo en Demerary Gazette - 1796. the first English language newspaper.
 Demerara Daily - fin. 1884. Published by C.K. Jardine.
 Berbice Gazette - Published in New Amsterdam by G.A. M'Kidd.
 Royal Gazette - Early 19th cen.
 The Colonist - 1884. Published by L. McDermott.
 The Argosy - 1880, printed a daily, weekly, and sports paper.
 Guyana Graphic - 1944-1975.

 The Echo - A weekly paper.
 The People - Published in Berbice.
 Freeman’s Sentinel - Focused on Afro-Guyanese content.
 New Nation - Official publications of the People's National Congress.
 Mirror - Official publications of the PPP. 
 A Liberdade - Portuguese language
 Indian Opinion - Focused on Indo-Guyanese content.
 The Workingman - Working-class content.
 The Liberator - Working-class content.
 Guyana Star - published by H.T. Harper

Magazines 

 The Arts Journal - Literary journal.
 Commercial Review
 Guiana Diocesan Magazine 
 Guiana Times (Also known as Times of Guiana) - 1947, published by Percy Armstrong. Anti-communist (PPP) content.

 Catholic Standard Magazine
 Guyana Journal of Public Administration
 Kaie - Literary journal, 1965-1985
 Kyk-Over-Al - Literary journal, Published by British Guiana Writers’ Association.
 New World Fortnightly - 1964
 Farm Journal - Formerly The Agricultural Journal of British Guiana
 Timehri - 1882, published by the Royal Agricultural and Commercial Society.
 British Guiana Medical Annual
 Police Magazine - Guyana Police Force
 The Scarlet Beret - Guyana Defence Force
 Chronicle Christmas Annual
 Queen’s College Annual - Established in 1936.
 Bishops’ High School Journal
 St. Stanislaus Magazine
 Guyana Historical Journal - Sporadically issued by the University of Guyana
 Guyana Law Journal - Sporadically issued by the University of Guyana

 Guyana Journal of Sociology and Transition - Sporadically issued by the University of Guyana
 Bar Association Review
 The Guyana Association of Professional Engineers Magazine
 Commercial Review
 Industrial Review
 Guyana Business
 The Public Servant
 Guiana Diocesan Magazine and Gazette
 Aarya Marga - Hindu 
 Sandeep - Hindu 
 The Islamic Muslim Journal 
 Al Muallim
 African Emancipation 
 Indian Horizons
 Ajedrez - Sport magazine
 Bourda Beat - Sport magazine
 Sports Beat - Sport magazine
 Caribbean Entertainer 
 Guyana Entertainment Magazine (GEM) - 2002
 The Creole - 1803-1966 Published by William S. Stevenson. Political weekly journal.
Thunder - PPP journal, 1950

See also
List of newspapers
Telecommunications in Guyana

References

Guyana
Newspapers